Fickle Fatty's Fall is a 1915 American short comedy film directed by and starring Fatty Arbuckle.

Cast
 Phyllis Allen
 Roscoe 'Fatty' Arbuckle 
 Glen Cavender
 Ivy Crosthwaite
 Alice Davenport
 Bobby Dunn
 Minta Durfee
 May Emory
 Edgar Kennedy
 Fritz Schade
 Al St. John
 Bobby Vernon
 Guy Woodward

See also
 Fatty Arbuckle filmography

References

External links

1915 films
Films directed by Roscoe Arbuckle
Films produced by Mack Sennett
Keystone Studios films
Triangle Film Corporation films
Silent American comedy films
1915 comedy films
1915 short films
American silent short films
American black-and-white films
American comedy short films
1910s American films